A crawl space is a narrow opening underneath the bottom of a building.

Crawl space or Crawlspace may also refer to:

Film
 Crawlspace (1972 film), a made-for-TV movie starring Arthur Kennedy
 Crawlspace (1986 film), a horror/thriller film starring Klaus Kinski
 Crawlspace (2004 film), an animated short film by Peter Sved
 Crawlspace (2012 film), an Australian science fiction film directed by Justin Dix
 Crawlspace (2013 film), an American horror/thriller film directed by Josh Stolberg
 Crawlspace (2016 film), an American horror/thriller film starring Michael Vartan

Music
 Crawlspace (band), an Australian rock band
 Crawl Space (album), a 1977 album by trumpeter Art Farmer
 Sevendust, an American hard rock band formerly known as Crawlspace
 "Crawlspace", a song by The Beastie Boys from To the 5 Boroughs

Television
 "Crawl Space" (Bob's Burgers), an episode of the TV series Bob's Burgers
 "Crawl Space" (Breaking Bad), an episode of the TV series Breaking Bad
 "Crawlspace" was the original name of "The Space" which is a children's programing block on TVOKids portion of TV Ontario.

Other media
 "Crawl Space" the first story arc in the comic series XXXombies written by Rick Remender, Tony Moore and Kieron Dwyer